Totally Hits 2001 is an album in the Totally Hits series, reaching #3 on the US Billboard 200 albums chart. The album contains two Billboard Hot 100 number-one hits: "U Remind Me" and "Fallin'".

Track listing
Blu Cantrell - "Hit 'Em Up Style (Oops!)" (4:08)
112 - "Peaches & Cream" (3:11)
Missy Elliott - "Get Ur Freak On" (3:56)
Alicia Keys featuring Busta Rhymes - "Fallin' (Remix)" (3:54)
P. Diddy, Black Rob & Mark Curry - "Bad Boy for Life" (4:09)
Dream featuring Kain - "This Is Me (Remix)" (4:08)
Usher - "U Remind Me" (4:07)
O-Town - "All or Nothing" (4:08)
Eve 6 - "Here's to the Night" (4:03)
Uncle Kracker - "Follow Me" (3:34)
LFO - "Every Other Time" (4:05)
Sugar Ray - "When It's Over" (3:35)
Willa Ford - "I Wanna Be Bad" (3:04)
Toya - "I Do!!" (3:30)
Outkast - "So Fresh, So Clean" (4:00)
Ludacris featuring Shawnna - "What's Your Fantasy" (4:31)
Craig David - "Fill Me In" (4:11)
Dido - "Thank You" (3:39)

Charts

Weekly charts

Year-end charts

Certifications

References

Totally Hits
2001 compilation albums